The 1940 Bathurst Grand Prix was a motor race staged at the Mount Panorama road racing circuit near Bathurst in New South Wales, Australia on 25 March 1940.
The race was contested on a handicap basis over a distance of 150 miles, comprising 37 laps of the course.
It was promoted by the New South Wales Light Car Club.

The race was won by Alf Barrett (Alfa Romeo "Monza"), who also set fastest time and fastest lap, the latter being a new lap record.

Results

Notes
 Entries: 22
 Non-starters: 3
 Starters: 19
 Finishers: 9
 Winner's average speed: "a little over 75 mph"
 Fastest lap: A. Barrett, 3m 4s, 78 mph (Lap record)
 Fastest time: A. Barrett

References

Bathurst Grand prix
Motorsport in Bathurst, New South Wales